Meyer Harris "Mickey" Cohen (September 4, 1913 – July 29, 1976) was an American gangster, boxer and entrepreneur based in Los Angeles during the mid-20th century.

Early life
Mickey Cohen was born on September 4, 1913, in New York City to Jewish parents. Cohen's parents immigrated to the USA from Kyiv.  He was first raised in New York City, moving with his mother and siblings to the  Boyle Heights neighborhood of Los Angeles at an early age. At 8, he earned money as a newsboy, selling newspapers on the street. One of his brothers, either Louie or Harry, would drop Mickey off at his regular corner, Soto and Brooklyn Streets (now Cesar E. Chavez Avenue). In 1922, Mickey was sent to reform school for petty crimes including shoplifting and theft.

Boxing career
As a teenager, Cohen began boxing in illegal prizefights in Los Angeles. In 1929, the 15-year-old moved from Los Angeles to Cleveland to train as a professional boxer with the alias of 'Irish Mickey Cohen'. His first professional boxing match was on April 8, 1930, against Patsy Farr in Cleveland. It was one of the preliminary fights on the card for the Paul Pirrone versus Jimmy Goodrich feature bout. In a match on June 12, 1931, Cohen fought and lost against future world featherweight champion Tommy Paul. Cohen was knocked out cold after 2:20 into the first round. It was during this contest that he earned the moniker "Gangster Mickey Cohen". On April 11, 1933, Cohen fought against Chalky Wright in Los Angeles. Wright won the match, and Mickey was incorrectly identified as "Mickey Cohen from Denver, Colorado" in the Los Angeles Times sports page report.  His last fight was on May 14, 1933, against Baby Arizmendi in Tijuana, Mexico. He finished his career at 8-8 and 5 draws – 8 wins, 2 by knockout, 8 losses, 4 losses by knockout and 5 draws.

Criminal career
In Cleveland, Cohen met Lou Rothkopf, an associate of gangster Moe Dalitz. Cohen later moved to New York, where he became an associate of labor racketeer Johnny Dio's brother, Tommy Dioguardi, and as well as Owney Madden.

Prohibition and the Chicago Outfit

During Prohibition, Cohen moved to Chicago and became involved in organized crime, working as an enforcer for the Chicago Outfit, where he briefly met Al Capone. During this period, Cohen was arrested for his role in the deaths of several gangsters in a card game.

After a brief time in prison, Cohen was released and began running card games and other illegal gambling operations. He later became an associate of Capone's younger brother, Mattie Capone. While working for Jake Guzik, Cohen was forced to flee Chicago after an argument with a rival gambler.

In Cleveland, Cohen worked once more for Lou Rothkopf, an associate of Meyer Lansky and Benjamin "Bugsy" Siegel. However, there was little work available for Cohen in Cleveland, so Lansky and Rothkopf arranged for Cohen to work with Siegel in Los Angeles.

From syndicate bodyguard to Sunset Strip kingpin
In 1939, Cohen arrived in Los Angeles to work under Benjamin "Bugsy" Siegel. During their association, Cohen helped set up the Flamingo Hotel in Las Vegas and ran its sports book operation. He also was instrumental in setting up the race wire, which was essential to Vegas betting. During this time, Cohen met prostitute Lavonne Weaver (working alias Simoni King), and the couple married in 1940.

In 1947, the crime families ordered the murder of Siegel due to his mismanagement of the Flamingo Hotel Casino, most likely because Siegel or his girlfriend Virginia Hill was skimming money. According to one account which does not appear in newspapers, Cohen reacted violently to Siegel's murder. Entering the Hotel Roosevelt, where he believed the killers were staying, Cohen fired rounds from his two .45 caliber semi-automatic handguns into the lobby ceiling and demanded that the assassins meet him outside in 10 minutes. However, no one appeared, and Cohen was forced to flee when the police arrived.

Cohen's violent methods came to the attention of state and federal authorities investigating Jack Dragna's operations. During this time, Cohen faced many attempts on his life, including the bombing of his home on posh Moreno Avenue in Brentwood. Cohen soon converted his house into a fortress, installing floodlights, alarm systems, and a well-equipped arsenal kept, as he often joked, next to his 200 tailor-made suits. Cohen briefly hired Johnny Stompanato as bodyguard. However, in 1958 Stompanato was killed in self-defense by Cheryl Crane, the daughter of actress Lana Turner (whom he had been dating). Cohen covered the expense for Stompanato's funeral and then gave Turner's love letters to Stompanato to the press in an attempt to discredit the worst allegations of threats and violence that Crane had alleged she suffered at the hands of the violent, womanizing Stompanato.

Later years
In 1950, Cohen was investigated along with many other underworld figures by a U.S. Senate committee known as the Kefauver Commission. As a result of this investigation, Cohen was convicted of tax evasion in June 1951 and sentenced to prison for four years.

Ben Hecht stated in his autobiography, A Child of the Century, that Cohen called him to say he wanted to do his part in helping Hecht raise money to support Menachem Begin's Irgun in its activities. Cohen called together a parlor meeting of business associates and had Hecht address them on the importance of the cause. Each person was then asked to call out a sum he would donate. In some cases, Cohen told a donor "that's not enough," and they upped the pledge. Later, when Cohen was arrested, he called Hecht from prison to ask if he had access to some cash to help with his bail. When Hecht apologized, Cohen politely said goodbye, and they never spoke again.

When he was released in October 1955, he became an international celebrity. He ran floral shops, paint stores, nightclubs, casinos, gas stations, a men's haberdashery, and even drove an ice cream van on San Vicente Boulevard in the Brentwood section of Los Angeles, according to author Richard Lamparski.

In 1957, TIME magazine wrote a  brief article about Cohen's meeting with Christian evangelist Billy Graham. Cohen said: "I am very high on the Christian way of life. Billy came up, and before we had food he said—What do you call it, that thing they say before food? Grace? Yeah, grace. Then we talked a lot about Christianity and stuff." Allegedly when Cohen did not change his lifestyle, he was confronted by Christian acquaintances. His response: "Christian football players, Christian cowboys, Christian politicians; why not a Christian gangster?"

In 1961, Cohen was again convicted of tax evasion and sent to Alcatraz. He was the only prisoner ever bailed out of Alcatraz; his bond was signed by U.S. Supreme Court Chief Justice Earl Warren. After his appeals failed, Cohen was sent to a federal prison in Atlanta, Georgia. His heavily armored Cadillac from this period was confiscated by the Los Angeles Police Department and is now on display at the Southward Car Museum in New Zealand. On August 14, 1963, during his time at the Atlanta Federal Penitentiary, inmate Burl Estes McDonald attempted to kill Cohen with a lead pipe. In 1972, Cohen was released from the Atlanta Federal Penitentiary, where he had spoken out against prison abuse. He had been misdiagnosed with an ulcer, which turned out to be stomach cancer. After undergoing surgery, he continued touring the United States and made television appearances, once with Ramsey Clark.

Death
Cohen died at age 62, of complications from stomach cancer surgery in July 1976.
He is interred in Hillside Memorial Park Cemetery in Culver City, California.

In popular culture and media

Films
In the film Bugsy (1991), Mickey Cohen is portrayed by actor Harvey Keitel. Keitel received an Oscar nomination for Best Supporting Actor.
In the film L.A. Confidential (1997), based on James Ellroy's 1990 novel, Mickey Cohen is portrayed by actor Paul Guilfoyle in a bit part but is a major influence throughout the rest of the movie.
In the film Gangster Squad (2013), Cohen is portrayed by actor Sean Penn and is the main antagonist of the film, portrayed as a sadistic and cruel man who enjoys murder and intends to expand his criminal enterprises to other major cities in the United States. The film shows a fictionalized version of Cohen's downfall: Cohen is beaten in a fistfight and arrested by the LAPD for murdering one of his subordinates, when he was actually imprisoned for tax evasion. Also, he is sentenced to life imprisonment, when in real life, Cohen was eventually released from custody and died of stomach cancer. It was also implied at the end of the film that Cohen was beaten to death with a lead pipe when he was sent to Alcatraz by acquaintances of the man he killed.
In the film The Lincoln Lawyer (2011), the protagonist, Michael Haller, played by actor Matthew McConaughey, owns a pistol said to have been owned by Mickey Cohen, and given to him by Haller's father after he successfully defended Cohen in a murder case.

Games
Patrick Fischler lends his voice and likeness to play Mickey Cohen in the 2011 video game L.A. Noire (set in 1947), who is involved in a few cases while working the Vice desk.

Literature
In James Ellroy's L.A. Quartet book series, Cohen plays a major supporting role in three of the novels: The Big Nowhere (1988), L.A. Confidential (1990) and White Jazz (1992).
In retired newspaperman Howard Scott Williams' 2017 memoir The Gangster's Butler, recounting stories he reported on from 1948 to 1976, he recounts posing as a butler for Cohen in order to get information for a story.

Television
 In Frank Darabont's television series Mob City, Cohen is portrayed by Jeremy Luke.
 In the 2022 miniseries The Offer, Cohen is portrayed by Louis Mandylor.

References

Additional sources
Davies, Lloyd G., Los Angeles City Council member, 1943–51, questioned police wiretaps on Mickey Cohen
Kelly, Robert J. Encyclopedia of Organized Crime in the United States. Westport, Connecticut: Greenwood Press, 2000. 
Phillips, Charles and Alan Axelrod. Cops, Crooks, and Criminologists: An International Biographical Dictionary of Law Enforcement. Updated edition. New York: Checkmark Books, 2000. 
Sifakis, Carl. The Mafia Encyclopedia. New York: Facts on File, 2005. 
Sifakis, Carl. The Encyclopedia of American Crime. New York: Facts on File, 2001.

Further reading
Ed Clark, "Trouble in Los Angeles", Life, 1950
Nugent, John Peer. Mickey Cohen, In My Own Words: The Underworld Autobiography of Michael Mickey Cohen, As Told To John Peer Nugent (Englewood Cliffs, New Jersey: Prentice-Hall, 1975) 
Kelly, Robert J. Encyclopedia of Organized Crime in the United States (Westport, Connecticut: Greenwood Press, 2000) 
Phillips, Charles and Alan Axelrod. Cops, Crooks, and Criminologists: An International Biographical Dictionary of Law Enforcement, Updated Edition (New York: Checkmark Books, 2000) 
Sifakis, Carl. The Mafia Encyclopedia (New York: Facts on File, 2005) 
Steve Stevens and Craig Lockwood, King of the Sunset Strip: Hangin' With Mickey Cohen and the Hollywood Mob (Cumberland House Publishing, 2006)
F. Murray, "The Charmed Life of M. Cohen", Front Page Detective, 1966, 30(3):44–45, 63.
Lewis, Brad. Hollywood's Celebrity Gangster: The Incredible Life and Times of Mickey Cohen (New York: Enigma Books, 2007) , .
George A. Day, JUANITA DALE SLUSHER alias CANDY BARR (ERBE Publishing Company, 2008 )
United States Treasury Department, Bureau of Narcotics, Mafia: The Government's Secret File on Organized Crime (Skyhorse Publishing, 2009) 
Tereba, Tere. Mickey Cohen: The Life and Crimes of L.A.'s Notorious Mobster (ECW Press, May 1, 2012) 

 Piper, Michael Collins, "Final judgment: The missing link in the JFK assassination conspiracy" (Wolfe Press 1995)

External links

Benny's Shadow: All about Mickey Cohen by Mark Gribben
Recollections of Mickey Cohen on the Los Angeles Times' Daily Mirror blog
Biography of Mickey Cohen  - Biography.com
Time, April 15, 1957
 
 Beyond 'Gangster Squad': The Real Mickey Cohen, by Tere Tereba

1913 births
1976 deaths
American crime bosses
American people convicted of tax crimes
Burials at Hillside Memorial Park Cemetery
Deaths from cancer in California
Deaths from stomach cancer
Jewish American gangsters
Sportspeople from Brooklyn
American people of Ukrainian-Jewish descent
Inmates of Alcatraz Federal Penitentiary
People from Boyle Heights, Los Angeles
Jewish boxers
Featherweight boxers
American male boxers
People from Brentwood, Los Angeles
Boxers from New York City
20th-century American Jews